Carystus is a genus of skipper butterflies in the family Hesperiidae.

Species
The genus Carystus consists of the following species:
Carystus cynaxa Hewitson, 1867
Carystus diores (Plötz, 1882)
Carystus elana (Plötz, 1882)
Carystus elvira (Plötz, 1882)
Carystus hocus Evans, 1955
Carystus hylaspes (Stoll, [1781])
Carystus jolus (Stoll, [1782])
Carystus junior Evans, 1955
Carystus lota Hewitson, 1877
Carystus metella (Plötz, 1882)
Carystus moeros (Möschler, 1877)
Carystus periphas Mabille, 1891
Carystus phorcus (Cramer, 1777)
Carystus ploetzi Mielke & Casagrande, 2002
Carystus superbiens Mabille, 1891

Former species
Carystus argus Möschler, 1879 - synonymized with Carystus lota Hewitson, 1877
Carystus dyscritus Mabille, 1891 - synonymized with Cobalopsis nero (Herrich-Schäffer, 1869)
Carystus epidius Mabille, 1891 - transferred to Pheraeus epidius (Mabille, 1891)
Carystus gemmatus Butler, 1872 - transferred to Dion gemmatus (Butler, 1872)
Carystus jeconia Butler, 1870 - transferred to Falga jeconia (Butler, 1870)
Carystus klugi Bell, 1941 - transferred to Mielkeus klugi (Bell, 1941)
Carystus lucia Capronnier, 1874 - transferred to Lucida lucia (Capronnier, 1874)
Carystus odilia Burmeister, 1878 - synonymized with Cymaenes lumina (Herrich-Schäffer, 1869)
Carystus salenus Mabille, 1883 - transferred to Synapte salenus (Mabille, 1883)
Carystus simulius  Druce, 1876 - transferred to Lindra simulius (Druce, 1876)
Carystus tetragraphus Mabille, 1891 - synonymized with Lotongus calathus (Hewitson, 1876)

References

Natural History Museum Lepidoptera genus database

Hesperiinae
Hesperiidae genera